BC Research Inc. is a privately owned Canadian process technology incubator, specializing in custom research, process development and technology commercialization. Headquartered in downtown Vancouver, British Columbia, BC Research operates primarily from their "Technology Commercialization and Innovation Centre" on Mitchell Island in the Vancouver suburb of Richmond. This 40,000 sq-ft facility includes a 28,000 sq-ft pilot plant development area (30 ft vertical clearance), 2,500 sq-ft laboratory space, 9,000 sq-ft of office space, as well as a small machine shop and fenced outdoor piloting space. Technologies are scaled up from concept to pilot or demonstration scale in preparation for commercialization. Engineering support is provided by parent company NORAM Engineering and Constructors Ltd, which specializes in process development and commercialization in six industrial business areas with plant installations in Canada and abroad.

Previously, BC Research occupied a  scientific research and development company located at the BC Research and Innovation Complex at the south end of the University of British Columbia campus. This facility closed in November 2007. The company specialized in consulting and applied research and development in the area of plant biotechnology and environment, health and safety, process and analysis, transportation and ship dynamics.

The company can be traced back to 1944 as it developed from the non-profit BC Research Council to a private company in 1993, founded by Dr. Hugh Wynne-Edwards, Ph.D, DSc., FRSC, a member of the Order of Canada, who served as the founding Chief Executive Officer and developed the facility into an incubator in the fields of biotechnology, drug discovery and alternative fuel technologies.

In 2000, BC Research was purchased by Immune Network Ltd and was sold to Cromedica (now PRA International) in July 2001 for a consideration of $8.3 million according to 2001 audited financials published on SEDAR. Its plant biotechnology team was mostly spun off in Silvagen Inc. which specialized in clonal reforestation and which became a part of CellFor.  In 1999 Azure Dynamics, a hybrid commercial vehicle systems developer, was formed with some of the transportation team and left the facility in 2004 having gone public in 2001 as Azure Dynamics Corporation. Radient Technologies, specializing in microwave-assisted cannabis extraction, purification and isolation, was also spun off in 2001 as a joint venture with Environment Canada. The remaining laboratory and consulting business functions continued under the name Vizon SciTec until August 2006 when CANTEST Ltd. announced its acquisition from BC Research Inc. which continues as a privately held technology holding company.

In May 2007, the former Industrial Process Division of BC Research was acquired by Kemetco Research Inc., providers of contract research, process development and laboratory testing services to industry, primarily in mining, metallurgy and chemical processing.   

Finally in 2010, BC Research Inc. (BCRI), opened again for business in Burnaby, B.C.  Their board of directors was composed of Kemetco and NORAM Engineering and Constructors Ltd. business and technology leaders. The Company continued to provide specialized consulting and applied research and development in an expanding number of different technologies and  industries, including fluidized beds, storage of energy in batteries, fuel cells, electrochemical cells, corrosion testing and analysis, hydrogen, sulfur, chlorine, nitration, water treatment, and pulp and paper chemistry.

In 2017, BCRI moved to a newly constructed facility on Mitchell Island in Vancouver B.C. to expand their capabilities. BC Research Inc. is now a wholly owned subsidiary of the NORAM group, a private, vertically integrated portfolio of businesses serving process scale-up, engineering, R&D, pilot plants, demonstration plants, modular plants, custom fabrication, and site assistance.

References

External links 
BC Research Inc.
Hugh Wynne-Edwards http://www.legacy.com/obituaries/vancouversun/obituary.aspx?pid=165088497
Encyclopedia of British Columbia, Edited by Daniel Francis, Harbour Publishing 2000
CANTEST Press Release, August 2006 http://www.cantest.com/cms/page3665.cfm
CellFor http://www.cellfor.com/home.html
 Technologies, Inc.
Kemetco Research Inc.

Research institutes in Canada
Companies based in Vancouver
Canadian companies established in 2010